Samia Gamal (born as Zaynab Khalil Ibrahim Mahfuz, 5 March 1924 – 1 December 1994) was an Egyptian belly dancer and film actress.

Biography

Born in the small Egyptian town of Wana in March 1924, Samia's family moved just months later to Cairo and settled near the Khan El-Khalili bazaar. It was many years later that Samia Gamal met Badia Masabni, the owner of a big Cairo nightclub back then. Badia offered Samia an invitation to join her dance company, which Samia accepted. Badia Masabni gave her the stage name Samia Gamal, and she began her dance career.

At first, she studied under Badia and Badia's star dancer at the time, Tahiya Karioka. However she soon became a respected soloist and brought forth her own style. Samia Gamal incorporated techniques from ballet and Latin dance into her solo performances. She was also the first to perform with high-heeled shoes on stage. She starred in dozens of Egyptian films next to the famous Farid Al Attrach. They could be thought of as the Fred Astaire and Ginger Rogers of the Middle East. They not only played each other's love interest on the silver screen but also in real life. However, their love was not meant to be. Because of Farid's social position, he refused to marry Samia. Farid believed that marriage kills artist talent, he never married. Some claim that Farid as a Druze prince, told her it would bring too much shame to his family for him to marry a belly dancer; but the claim is baseless. Farid helped place Samia on the National Stage by risking all he owned, and managed to borrow to produce a film (Habib al omr) co-starring with her in 1947.

In 1949, Egypt's King Farouk proclaimed Samia Gamal "The National Dancer of Egypt", which brought US attention to the dancer.

In 1950, Samia came to the US and was photographed by Gjon Mili. She also performed in the Latin Quarter, New York's trendy nightclub. She later married the so-called "Texas millionaire" Shepherd King III, whom, it was later reported only had about $50,000. However, their marriage did not last long.

In 1958, Samia Gamal married Rushdy Abaza, one of the most famous Egyptian actors with whom Samia starred in a number of films, notably the box-office hit The Second Man (1959) alongside Egypt's iconic actor Salah Zulfikar, one of the most famous Egyptian actors, and Sabah, famous actress and singer and directed by the legendary Egyptian film director Ezz El-Dine Zulficar, this film became an Egyptian masterpiece and the most notable role in Samia Gamal's cinematic career. In 1972, she stopped dancing when she was nearly in her 50s but began again after given advice by Samir Sabri. She then danced until the early 1980s.

Samia Gamal died on 1 December 1994, at 70 years of age in Cairo. Samia's charismatic performances in Egyptian and international films gave Egypt's Oriental Dance recognition and admiration in Egypt and worldwide.

Tribute
On 5 March 2017, Google dedicated a Doodle to the actress for the 93rd anniversary of her birth. The Doodle reached all the countries of the Arab World.

Filmography
 Samia Forever (Documentary, 2003)
 Fabulous Samia Gamal, The, (Documentary, 2003)
 The Stars of Egypt: Volume 3: Samia Gamal, Part I (Film, 19??)
 The Stars of Egypt: Volume 3: Samia Gamal, Part II (Film, 19??)
Saat al-Sifr (Film, 1972)
al-Shaytan wa-al-Kharif (Film, 1972)
Bint al-Hatah (Film, 1964)
Zuqaq al-Madaq (Film, 1963)
 Tarik al shaitan aka The Way of the Devil (Film, 1963)
Marhaban Ayuha al-Hubb (Film, 1962)
Abu al-Layl (Film, 1962)
 Waada el hub a.k.a. And Love Returned (Film, 1961)
Sukar Hanim (Film, 1960)
Wa Ada al-Hubb (Film, 1960)
 Nagham el hazine, El a.k.a. Sad Melody (Film, 1960)
 El Ragul el thani, El a.k.a. The Second Man (Film, 1959)
 Kull daqqa fi qalbi a.k.a. Every Beat of My Heart (Film, 1959)
 Maweed maa maghoul a.k.a. Rendezvous with a Stranger (Film, 1959)
 Gharam al-miliunayr a.k.a. Love of the Millionaire (Film, 1957)
Habiby al-Asmar (Film, 1957)
 Amanti del deserto, Gli aka Desert Warrior (Film, 1956)
Zanubah (Film, 1956)
Awwal Gharam (Film, 1956)
 Masque de Toutankhamon, Le aka Trésor des pharaons, Le (Film, 1955)
 Sigarah wa kas a.k.a. A Glass and a Cigarette (Film, 1955)
 Ali Baba et les quarante voleurs aka Ali Baba; Ali Baba wa-al-Arbain Harami ; Ali Baba and the Forty Thieves (1954 film) (Film, 1954)
 Valley of the Kings (Film, 1954)
 Nachala hanem a.k.a. The Lady Pickpocket (Film, 1952)
 Raqsat al-wadah a.k.a. The Farewell Dance (Film, 1954)
 Ketar el lail a.k.a. The Night Train (Film, 1953)
Al-wahsh a.k.a. The Monster (Film, 1952)
 Ma takulshi la hada a.k.a. Tell No-one; Don't Tell Anyone (Film, 1952)
Intiqam al-Habib (Film, 1951)
Khad al-Jamil (Film, 1951)
Taa la salim a.k.a. Come and Say Hello (Film, 1951)
Asmar wa-Jamil (Film, 1950)
Akher kedba a.k.a. The Final Lie (Film, 1950)
Sat al-Husn (Film, 1950)
Amir al-Intiqam a.k.a. The Count of Monte Cristo (Film, 1950)
 Sakr, El a.k.a. The Falcon (Film, 1950)
 Nuit des étoiles, La (Film, 1950)
 Afrita hanem a.k.a. Lady Afrita; Lady Genie; Little Miss Devil; The Genie Lady (Film, 1949)
 Agaza fel gahannam a.k.a. Holidays in Hell (Film, 1949)
 Bahebbak inta a.k.a. I Love You Only (Film, 1949)
Lo Sparviero del Nilo  (Film, 1949)
Bint al-Haz (Film, 1948)
 Mughamer, El a.k.a. The Adventurer (Film, 1948)
 Sahibat el amara a.k.a. The Landlady (Film, 1948)
 El Ahdab a.k.a. The Hunchback (Film, 1947)
 El Ersane talata a.k.a. The Three Suitors (Film, 1947)
 Habib al omr a.k.a. The Love of My Life (Film, 1947)
 al-Bani adam a.k.a. Sons of Adam (Film, 1945)
Sharazad (film) (Film, 1945)
Ahmar Shafayif (Film, 1945)
Al-Jins al-Latif (Film, 1945)
 Taxi hantur a.k.a. A Hansom Carriage (Film, 1945)
Al-hub al-Awwal (Film, 1945)
Abnaty (film, 1944)
Russassa fil al-Qalb a.k.a. A Bullet in the Heart (Film, 1944)
Khafaya al-Madinah (Film, 1943)
Min Fat Qadimuh (Film, 1943)
Mamnu al-Hob (Film, 1943)
 Ali Baba wa al arbain harame a.k.a. Ali Baba and the Forty Thieves (Film, 1942) 
 Gawhara (Film, 1942)

See also
List of dancers
Women in dance

References

External links
 Samia Gamal bio at Go-Bellydance.com
 Samia Gamal bio at The Bellydance Museum
 Egyptian Greats at Jasmin Jahal.com
 Samia Gamal bio at waleg.com
 Samia Gamal bio at Hossam Ramsey.com
 
 Video Clip of Samia Gamal and Farid Al-Atrache from the movie Afrita Hanem
 Many video clips for the legend Samia Gamal

1924 births
1994 deaths
Egyptian female dancers
Belly dancers
Egyptian film actresses
20th-century Egyptian actresses
People from Beni Suef Governorate
Egyptian expatriates in the United States